Guernsey competed in the 2010 Commonwealth Games held in Delhi, India, from 3 to 14 October 2010.

Aquatics

Swimming

Team Guernsey consists of 6 swimmers.

Xander Beaton, Thomas Hollingsworth, Ian Hubert, Ben Lowndes, Jeremy Osborne, Ian Powell.

Athletics

Team Guernsey consists of 8 athletes.

Matthew Bailey, Tom Druce, Dale Garland, Helen Hadjam, Lee Merrien, Kylie Robilliard, Hywel Robinson, Nathan Stevens.

Badminton

Team Guernsey consists of 2 badminton players.

Elena Johnson, Gayle Lloyd.
Women's Singles

Women's Doubles

Cycling

Team Guernsey consists of 4 cyclists.

Road

Men

Women

Lawn Bowls

Team Guernsey consists of 9 lawn bowls players.

Donald Batiste, Lucy Beere, Garry Collins, Daniel De La Mare, Gwen De La Mare, Matthew Le Ber, Alison Merrien, Ian Merrien, Gary Pitschou.

Shooting

Team Guernsey consists of 2 shooters.

Adam Jory, Peter Jory.

Squash

Team Guernsey consists of 5 squash players.

Henry Birch, Zephanie Curgenven, Natalie Dodd, Issey Norman-Ross, Chris Simpson.
Men's Singles

Women's Singles

Women's Doubles

Mixed Doubles

Table Tennis
Liam James Robilliard, Kay Chivers, Garry Dodd, Oliver Langlois, Alice Loveridge, Dawn Morgan, Matthew Stubbington, Coach: Lloyd Doyley (Guernsey) (Greenway School PE teacher).
Men's Singles

Women's Singles

Men's Doubles

Women's Doubles

Mixed Doubles

Men's Team
Garry Dodd, Olly Langlois, Matthew Stubbington

Women's Team
Alice Loveridge, Dawn Morgan, Kay Chivers

Tennis

Team Guernsey consists of 3 players.

Patrick Ogier, Dominic McLuskey, Heather Watson.
Men

Women

Mixed

See also
 2010 Commonwealth Games

References

Guernsey at the Commonwealth Games
Nations at the 2010 Commonwealth Games
2010 in Guernsey